This is a list of youth orchestras in the United States.

Youth orchestras are performing groups for student musicians. The age range of participants varies; they may include musicians up to grade 12 or they may include older university and conservatory students. In the United States, youth orchestras are operated primarily for music education. Some are associated with professional symphony orchestras. Professional symphony orchestras have multiple motivations for sponsoring youth orchestras, including training of young musicians and building future audiences by engaging children with classical music. A 2006–7 survey of youth orchestras by the League of American Orchestras found that 75% of the participating orchestral groups were independent, about 19% were affiliated with adult orchestras, and about 3% were associated with educational institutions.

The first and oldest U.S. youth orchestra is the Portland Youth Philharmonic, founded in 1924 as the Portland Junior Symphony Association. Russian émigré Jacques Gershkovitch was the Portland group's first conductor. It was followed in 1935 by the Young People's Symphony Orchestra in Berkeley, California, which describes itself as the second oldest independent youth symphony in the country. By 1963, Life magazine counted about 15,000 youth orchestras in the country and noted that they were producing music of a caliber that could appeal to adult audiences.

The USA was slow to create a national youth orchestra. One existed, from 1940 to 1942, established and led by Leopold Stokowski and consisting of instrumental musicians between the ages of 18 and 25. Stokowski personally auditioned many of the 15,000 young musicians who applied to become members of the All-American Youth Orchestra. The orchestra he assembled consisted of about 100 musicians, one-fifth of whom were women. A small number of professional musicians from the Philadelphia Orchestra played with the younger musicians. The All-American Youth Orchestra made several recordings and toured in Latin America as well as the United States during its two years of existence before being disbanded due to the exigencies imposed by U.S. involvement in World War II.

In 2012 the Weill Music Institute of Carnegie Hall launched the National Youth Orchestra of the United States of America (NYO-USA). By March 2013, the names of the 120 musicians chosen by were announced and the orchestra toured Washington, Moscow, St Petersburg and London in July 2013. The National Youth Orchestra continues to operate as of 2022.

Adult symphony orchestras in the United States are in a separate list of symphony orchestras in the United States.

National
 National Youth Orchestra of the United States of America
 Orchestra America

Arizona
 Vail Youth Symphony, Tucson

California
 American Youth Symphony
 California Youth Symphony
 Los Angeles Junior Philharmonic Orchestra
 Pacific Symphony Youth Orchestra
 Palo Alto Chamber Orchestra
 Sacramento Youth Symphony
 San Francisco Symphony Youth Orchestra
 San Jose Youth Symphony
 Winds Across the Bay
 Young People's Symphony Orchestra

Colorado
 Denver Young Artists Orchestra

Connecticut
 Western Connecticut Youth Orchestra
 Norwalk Youth Symphony

Florida
 Florida Symphony Youth Orchestras
 Florida Young Artists Orchestra
 Florida Youth Orchestra
 Jacksonville Symphony Youth Orchestra
 Metropolitan Area Youth Symphony

Georgia
 Atlanta Symphony Youth Orchestra
 Georgia Youth Symphony Orchestra

Illinois
 Chicago Youth Symphony Orchestras
 Elgin Youth Symphony Orchestra
Midwest Young Artists Conservatory

Indiana
 Indianapolis Youth Orchestra

Kentucky
 Louisville Youth Orchestra

Maryland
 Gamer Symphony Orchestra at the University of Maryland
 Maryland Classic Youth Orchestras

Massachusetts
 Boston Youth Symphony Orchestras
 Boston Philharmonic Youth Orchestra

Minnesota
 Minnesota Youth Symphonies
 Mankato Area Youth Symphony Orchestra
 Greater Twin Cities Youth Symphonies

Missouri 
 Saint Louis Symphony Youth Orchestra

Nevada
 The Young Artists Orchestra of Las Vegas

New Jersey
 New Jersey State Youth Orchestra
 New Jersey Youth Symphony

New Mexico
 Albuquerque Youth Symphony

New York
 The Children's Orchestra Society
 Empire State Youth Orchestra
 InterSchool Orchestras of New York
 New York Youth Symphony
 National Youth Orchestra of the United States of America

Ohio
 Akron Youth Symphony
 Cleveland Orchestra Youth Orchestra
 Contemporary Youth Orchestra

Oklahoma
 Tulsa Youth Symphony

Oregon
 Eugene-Springfield Youth Orchestras

 Metropolitan Youth Symphony
 Portland Youth Philharmonic

Pennsylvania
 Philadelphia Youth Orchestra
 Pittsburgh Youth Symphony Orchestra
 Reading Symphony Youth Orchestra

Texas
 Greater Dallas Youth Orchestra
 Youth Orchestras of San Antonio

Utah 
 Lyceum Philharmonic at American Heritage School

Virginia
 American Youth Philharmonic Orchestras
 Peninsula Youth Orchestra
 Richmond Symphony Youth Orchestra
 Williamsburg Youth Orchestra

Washington
 Seattle Youth Symphony Orchestras

Wisconsin
 Milwaukee Youth Symphony Orchestra

Washington, D.C.
 DC Youth Orchestra Program

References

List of youth orchestras in the United States
Lists of musicians
Lists of organizations based in the United States
United States, youth